Fort Supply Lake is in Woodward County, Oklahoma, about  south of Fort Supply and  northwest of Woodward.

The lake was created in 1942 by damming Wolf Creek, although the work actually began in 1938. The primary purposes of the lake are for flood control and conservational storage. The lake has  of shoreline.

Recreational opportunities are readily available. Fishing is allowed and there  are three handicap-accessible fishing piers in addition to shore fishing. Popular species include crappie, walleye, white bass, hybrid bass, channel catfish and flathead catfish.

The Corps of Engineers and the Oklahoma Department of Wildlife Conservation manage the adjacent hunting area. It is open year-round. Bobwhite quail and deer are the most popular species for hunters, but other species hunted include wild turkey, pheasant, dove, waterfowl, squirrel and rabbit.

References

Reservoirs in Oklahoma
Protected areas in Woodward County, Oklahoma
1942 establishments in Oklahoma
Bodies of water of Woodward County, Oklahoma